The 1909 Virginia Orange and Blue football team represented the University of Virginia as an independent during the 1903 college football season. Led by John Neff in his first and only season as head coach, the Orange and Blue compiled a record of 7–1.

Freshman Archer Christian was trampled to death in the Georgetown game.

Schedule

References

Virginia
Virginia Cavaliers football seasons
Virginia Orange and Blue football